Telegraph Peak is a summit in the U.S. state of Nevada.

Telegraph Peak was named in commemoration of the first transcontinental telegraph.

References

Mountains of Lander County, Nevada